Charles Wallace Alexander Napier Cochrane-Baillie, 2nd Baron Lamington,  (29 July 1860 – 16 September 1940), was a British politician and colonial administrator who served as Governor of Queensland from 1896 to 1901, and Governor of Bombay from 1903 to 1907.

Early life
Born in London, England, he was the only son of Alexander Baillie-Cochrane, 1st Baron Lamington. Charles was educated at Eton College and Christ Church, Oxford, where he graduated with a Bachelor of Arts in 1883. In 1885, he became assistant private secretary to the Prime Minister of the United Kingdom, Lord Salisbury.

Political career
Cochrane-Baillie was narrowly defeated in the 1885 election for the borough constituency of St Pancras North, but he won the subsequent election in July 1886, taking his seat in the British House of Commons for the Conservative Party.

Upon the death of his father in 1890, he succeeded as the 2nd Baron Lamington.

On 13 June 1895, he married Mary Houghton Hozier at St Michael's Church, Pimlico; they had two children, a son and a daughter. 

In 1890, the British government sent Lord Lamington to travel between Tonkin in Vietnam and Siam, with a view to annexing at least the Xishuangbanna district and possibly the whole Yunnan province of China in an attempt to limit French colonisation of the area.

Governorships
Cochrane-Baillie was in the Royal Company of Archers, as King's body guard for Scotland. In October 1895, Lord Lamington was selected to replace Sir Henry Norman as Governor of Queensland. His tenure as Governor was from 9 April 1896 to 19 December 1901. He was a very politically conservative governor, and expressed a concern that the Federation of Australia which took place during his tenure would lead to unrestrained socialism. He also worked with the first Premier of Queensland, Sir Samuel Griffith, to ensure that the role of state governors was not diminished after Federation.

Apart from six months leave in England when he was appointed a Knight Grand Cross of the Order of St Michael and St George, Lord Lamington served as governor for five years until 19 December 1901. In 1903 he was made a Knight Grand Commander of the Order of the Indian Empire, and appointed as Governor of Bombay (until his resignation in July 1907), where the royal prerogative he exercised was far more powerful than it had been in Australia. He is also noted as being sympathetic, after having met ‘Abdu’l-Bahá, to the Baháʼí Faith.

Later life
Lord Lamington was appointed captain of the Lanarkshire Yeomanry on 26 March 1902.

In Spring 1919, he served as Commissioner of the British Relief Unit in Syria, prior to its allocation as a French mandate.

On 13 March 1940, he was one of four victims of a shooting at the Caxton Hall in London by Indian nationalist Udham Singh. Former lieutenant-governor of India, Michael O'Dwyer was killed instantly. O'Dwyer's predecessor in the role, Louis Dane, suffered a broken arm. Cochrane-Baillie and Lawrence Dundas, the former secretary of state for India, were slightly injured.

He died at his family home, Lamington House, in Lanarkshire, Scotland, on 16 September 1940, aged 80.

Other roles and ranks (undated)
 President of the East India Association 
 President of the National Indian Association 
 President of the Middle East Association 
 President of the Indigent Moslems Burial Fund 
 President of the British Red Crescent Society 
 President of 'other organisations concerned with Eastern welfare and culture' 
 President of the Persia Society (forerunner of the Iran Society) (--1912--)
 Vice President of the Royal Central Asian Society 
 Vice-President of the Royal Geographical Society of London 
 Chairman of the Committee of the Royal Normal College and Academy of Music for the Blind (--1913--) 
 A Vice-President of the Trinity College of Music, London (--1913--) 
 Lieutenant-Colonel of the 6th Battalion, The Scottish Rifles (Cameronians) 
 Captain of the Royal Company of Archers (King's Bodyguard for Scotland) 
 Lieutenant-Colonel of the Lanarkshire Yeomanry

Personal life
Lord Lamington married Mary Houghton Hozier, the youngest daughter of William Hozier, 1st Baron Newlands, on 13 June 1895. They had two children, a son Victor Alexander Brisbane William Cochrane-Baillie (1896–1951, godson of Queen Victoria and in 1940 became the 3rd Baron Lamington) and a daughter Grisell Annabella Gem Cochrane-Baillie (1898–1985).

Lady Lamington's diary, her 'little pamphlet of memories', held by the State Library of Queensland, paints a detailed portrait of their life as public figures in the colonies.

Legacy
Lord Lamington is best known in Australia for allegedly giving his name to the lamington, a popular Australian cake consisting of a cube of sponge cake dipped in chocolate icing and sprinkled with desiccated coconut. The stories of the creation of the lamington vary widely, although in most versions Lamington's chef Armand Galland at Queensland's Government House devises the cake either by accident or due to a shortage of ingredients. Lamington is also reported to have referred to the cakes as "those bloody poofy woolly biscuits".

The Lamington Plateau and National Park in Queensland, Lamington Bridge in Maryborough, Queensland, Mount Lamington (a volcano in Papua New Guinea), and Lamington Road in Mumbai Lamington High School in Hubli were also named after him.

The Lady Lamington Hospital for Women and Lady Lamington Nurses Home are now part of Royal Brisbane Hospital Nurses' Homes.

References

Note and source

1860 births
1940 deaths
Alumni of Christ Church, Oxford
Conservative Party (UK) MPs for English constituencies
UK MPs 1886–1892
UK MPs who inherited peerages
Barons in the Peerage of the United Kingdom
Conservative Party (UK) hereditary peers
Governors of Queensland
Governors of Bombay
Knights Grand Cross of the Order of St Michael and St George
Knights Grand Commander of the Order of the Indian Empire
Deputy Lieutenants of Glasgow
Lanarkshire Yeomanry officers
Members of the Bombay Legislative Council
Charles
Fellows of the Royal Scottish Geographical Society
Eldest sons of British hereditary barons
British colonial governors and administrators in Oceania